The greengages are a group of cultivars of the common European plum. The first true greengage came from a green-fruited wild plum which originated in Iran (Persia). Greengages are grown in temperate areas and are known for the rich, confectionery flavour. They are considered to be among the finest dessert plums.

The Oxford English Dictionary regards "gage" and "greengage" as synonyms. However, not all gages are green, and some horticulturists make a distinction between the two words, with greengages as a variety of the gages, scientifically named Prunus domestica (subsp. italica var. claudiana.) The gages  otherwise include the large and usually purple to blackish but occasionally bright yellow round plums as well as the ancient and little-known Austrian varieties Punze (var. rotunda) and Weinkriech (var. vinaria).

Description
Greengage fruit are identified by their round-oval shape and smooth-textured, pale green flesh; they are on average smaller than round plums but larger than mirabelle plums (usually between 2 and 4 cm diameter). The skin ranges in colour from green to yellowish, with a pale blue "blush" in some cultivars; a few Reine Claudes, such as 'Graf Althanns', are reddish-purple due to crossbreeding with other plums.

History and etymology
Greengage fruit originated in the Middle East. Although "Green Gages" were previously thought to have been first imported into England from France in 1724 by Sir William Gage, 7th Baronet, though a greengage seed was found embedded in a 15th-century building in Hereford. Supposedly, the labels identifying the French plum trees were lost in transit to Gage's home at Hengrave Hall, near Bury St Edmunds More recent research indicates that it was a cousin and namesake Sir William Gage, 2nd Baronet of Hengrave who was responsible for introducing the greengage to England.  Soon after, greengages were cultivated in the American colonies, even being grown on the plantations of American presidents George Washington (1732–1799) and Thomas Jefferson (1743–1826). However, their cultivation in North America has declined significantly since the 18th century.

The name Reine Claude (French for "Queen Claude"), by which they are known in France, is in honour of the French queen Claude (1499–1524), Duchess of Brittany. A greengage is also called  (French for "the good Queen") in France.

Cultivation

Greengages are widely grown in particular in western Europe. The core of their range extends from France to southern England. In Germany, where they are called  or Ringlotte, numerous cultivars have been developed too. They are widely grown, typically for stewing in syrup to make a compote. In Portugal, however, they make up a delicacy invented by Dominican nuns in the 16th or 17th century (when confined to their convents) in the town of Elvas, where they are boiled in a sugary syrup several times, over the course of several weeks, to then be preserved whole in syrup or dried, coated in sugar and eaten either with a local dessert, sericaia, made from eggs, sugar, milk, cinnamon and flour or eaten with rich cheeses. 

At least the green cultivars breed more or less true from seed. Several similar cultivars produced from seedlings are now available; some of these include other plum cultivars in their parentage. Widely grown cultivars include:

 Boddarts Reneclode (Germany)
 Bryanston (UK)
 Cambridge Gage (UK)
  (Turkey)
 Denniston's Superb (USA)
 Gojeh Sabz (Iran)
  or Göy Alça  (Azerbaijan)
 Golden Transparent (UK)
 Graf Althanns Reneklode (Germany)
 Green Vanilla (Mount Pelion, Greece)
 Große Grüne Reneklode (Germany) / Reine Claude Verte (France)
 Laxton's Gage (UK)
 Laxton's Supreme (UK)
 Meroldts Reneclode (Germany)

 Rainha Cláudia (Portugal)
  (Italy)
 Reine Claude de Bavay (France)
 Reine Claude d'Oullins (France)
 Uhinks Reneklode (Germany)
 Washington (USA)

Culture
The fruit has inspired a film, The Greengage Summer (called The Loss of Innocence in the USA) which is a 1961 British drama film set in France. It was based on the novel The Greengage Summer (1958) by Rumer Godden.

One Monty Python's Flying Circus sketch involved a deranged self-defence instructor (played by John Cleese) whose main hypothetical enemy was fresh fruit. When trying to get him to focus on more menacing foes, his exasperated students began ticking off the fruits they had already bravely battled, including 'greengages, lemons, plums, and mangoes in syrup!'

More recently, the tree features in the novel The Enlightenment of the Greengage Tree (2017) by Iranian-Australian author Shokoofeh Azar.

References

Plum cultigens